Arthur J. Bidwill (June 24, 1903 – October 4, 1985) was an American politician and lawyer.

Born in Chicago, Illinois, Bidwill received his law degree from Notre Dame Law School and lived in River Forest, Illinois. He was a Republican. He served in the Illinois State Senate from 1935 until 1972 and was president pro tempore of the senate. His nephews Richard A. Walsh and William D. Walsh also served in the Illinois General Assembly. Bidwill died in Lake Geneva, Wisconsin.

He was the Republican nominee for Illinois Auditor of Public Accounts in 1936.

He ran unsuccessfully for the Republican nomination for Illinois Secretary of State in 1940.

Notes

1903 births
1985 deaths
Politicians from Chicago
Notre Dame Law School alumni
Illinois lawyers
Republican Party Illinois state senators
20th-century American lawyers
Bidwill family
20th-century American businesspeople
20th-century American politicians
People from River Forest, Illinois